The R211 road is a regional road in Ireland, located in County Louth, located north of Dunleer.

References

Regional roads in the Republic of Ireland
Roads in County Louth